Circus skills are a group of disciplines that have been performed as entertainment in circus, sideshow, busking, or variety, vaudeville, or music hall shows. Most circus skills are still being performed today. Many are also practiced by non-performers as a hobby.

Circus schools and instructors use various systems of categorization to group circus skills by type. Systems that have attempted to formally organize circus skills into pragmatic teaching groupings include the Gurevich system (the basis of the Russian Circus School's curriculum) and the Hovey Burgess system.

Circus skills

 Acrobalance
 Acrobatics
 Acro dance
 Adagio
 Aerial hoop
 Aerial silk
 Aerial straps
 Artistic cycling
 Balancing
 Banquine
 Baton twirling
 Buffoonery
 Bullwhip
 Bungee trapeze
 Cannonball catching
 Carnival barking
 Chair balancing
 Chinese pole
 Cigar box juggling
 Cloud swing
 Clowning
 Club swinging
 Contact juggling
 Contortion
 Corde lisse
 Cradle
 Cyr wheel
 Danish pole
 Devil sticks
 Diabolo or Chinese yo-yo
 Double trapeze
 Fire performance
 Flag spinning
 Flying trapeze
 Foot juggling
 Freestanding ladder
 German wheel
 Globe of death
 Hair hang
 Hand to hand
 Hand balancing
 Hand walking
 Hat manipulation
 Hoop diving
 Hooping
 "Human" cannonball
 Human pyramid
 Juggling
 Jump rope
 Knife throwing
 Lasso
 "Lion taming"
 Mexican cloud swing 
 Mime
 Multiple trapeze
 Object manipulation
 Perch (equilibristic)
 Physical comedy
 Plate spinning
 Pogo sticking
 Poi spinning
 Puppetry
 Rebound straps
 Ringmaster
 Risley
 Rola bola, balance board
 Rolling globe
 Roman ladders
 Russian bar
 Russian swing
 Slacklining
 Slackwire balancing
 Spanish web
 Springboard
 Stage combat
 Static trapeze
 Stilt walking
 Teeterboard
 Tightrope walking
 Trampolining
 Trapeze
 Trick riding
 Trick roping
 Tumbling
 Twirling
 Unicycle
 Ventriloquism
 Voltige
 Wall of death
 Wheel of Death
 Whistling

Sideshow attractions

 Bed of nails
 Bee bearding
 Blade box
 Body modification
 Body piercing
 Chapeaugraphy
 Contortion
 Electric act
 Entomophagy (insect eating)
 Escapology
 Fire breathing
 Fire eating
 Girl to Gorilla, a Pepper's Ghost illusion
 Glass eating
 Glass walking
 Gurner
 Hook suspension
 Human blockhead
 Human dartboard
 Impalement arts
 Iron tongue
 Magic acts
 Regurgitator
 Shallow diving
 Snake charmer
 Strongman
 Sword ladder
 Sword swallowing

References

Further reading
Burgess, Hovey (1976). Circus Technique. Drama Book Specialists. .

 
Street performance

fr:Cirque#Liste des diverses sp.C3.A9cialit.C3.A9s repr.C3.A9sent.C3.A9es
ru:Цирк (искусство)